This is a list of colleges and universities in Wyoming. In addition to colleges and universities, this list also includes other educational institutions in Wyoming providing higher education, meaning tertiary, quaternary, and, in some cases, post-secondary education.

List

See also
 Higher education in the United States
 List of college athletic programs in Wyoming
 List of American institutions of higher education
 List of recognized higher education accreditation organizations
List of colleges and universities
List of colleges and universities by country

External links
Wyoming Department of Education
Wyoming Community College Commission

References 

 
Wyoming, List of colleges and universities in
Colleges and universities